Kairos is the twelfth studio album by the Brazilian metal band Sepultura. It was released on June 24, 2011 by independent German record label Nuclear Blast Records. This is the band's first release on the label, marking their first album not released on SPV/Steamhammer since 2001's Nation.

Background and recording
On July 6, 2010, it was announced that Sepultura were signed with Nuclear Blast Records, and would release their first album for the label in 2011.
By the end of 2010, the band had begun writing new material and entered the studio to begin recording their twelfth album with producer Roy Z (Judas Priest, Halford, Iron Maiden's Bruce Dickinson, Helloween).
Recording sessions for Kairos took place from December 2010 to March 2011 at Trama Studios in São Paulo, Brazil, the same studio where its 2009 predecessor A-Lex was recorded.

On March 1, 2011, it was announced that Sepultura had completed recording their album, which was tentatively due in May 2011.
Days after the album was finished, Sepultura announced on March 4, 2011 that the album would be called Kairos and would be released around that late spring or early summer. Kairos was Sepultura's last album recorded with drummer Jean Dolabella, as he left the band five months after its release.

Concept
Speaking of how the band came up with the Kairos title, guitarist Andreas Kisser said: 
According to the guitarist, the concept had to do with Sepultura's 26-year-old history and the changes inside and outside the band. "It's a collection of 'kairos' that [got us] here. It's being inspired by our own biography, but mostly [focusing] on what Sepultura is today," he added.

Reception

Kairos was well received by music critics and fans. It sold over 2,500 copies in the United States in its first week of release and topped the CMJ Loud Rock chart for three weeks. The album charted in Germany, Austria and Switzerland. The band toured Europe, the US, Canada and Brazil for the Kairos World Tour.

The song "Mask" is a downloadable content in the 2012 video game Twisted Metal.

Track listing

DVD
The deluxe edition also comes with a bonus DVD. Over its 50:16 running length, the film shows the band in the rehearsal room running through the songs together, and in the studio recording the album. It also contains interviews with all the band members, and producer, engineer and mixer Roy Z.

Credits

Sepultura
 Derrick Green – vocals
 Andreas Kisser – guitars
 Paulo Jr. – bass
 Jean Dolabella – drums, percussion

Additional personnel
 Les Tambours du Bronx – percussion on "Structure Violence (Azzes)"
 Roy Z – production, engineering, mixing
 Maor Appelbaum – mastering engineering
 Paulo Chagas – assistant
 Ronaldo Frige – assistant
 Jon Mattox – sound design, treatments

References

2011 albums
Sepultura albums
Nuclear Blast albums
Albums produced by Roy Z